Müdri (also, Myudri and Myudry) is a village and municipality in the Ismailli Rayon of Azerbaijan.  It has a population of 220.  The municipality consists of the villages of Müdri and Nanıc.

References 

Populated places in Ismayilli District